Stadionul Gheorghe Ciociu is a multi-purpose stadium in the Fedeleșoiu village, Dăești commune, Romania. It is currently used mostly for football matches, is the home ground of Viitorul Dăești and holds 1,500 people (500 on seats).

References

External links
Stadionul Gheorghe Ciociu at soccerway.com
Stadionul Gheorghe Ciociu at europlan-online.de

Football venues in Romania
Sport in Vâlcea County
Buildings and structures in Vâlcea County